The FBA 19 was a flying boat bomber developed in France in 1924 by Franco-British Aviation.

Design 
Similar in configuration to FBA's wartime designs, it was a conventional biplane flying boat with open cockpits for the three crewmembers. Unlike the firm's earlier designs, however, the engine was mounted tractor-fashion in a streamlined nacelle mounted in the interplane gap.

Operational history 
The prototype set a world altitude record for its class with a 500 kg payload, but despite this performance, the French Navy did not order it, either in its original form or when it was offered as an amphibian. Another version was built as a commercial transport, but the only example built was sold to Air Union.

Variants
FBA 19 HB.2 (Hydravion de Bombardement) -  2-seat reconnaissance bomber; 9 built.
FBA 19 HMB.2 (Hydravion Mixte de Bombardement) -  2-seat amphibian reconnaissance bomber.
FBA 19 HMT.3 (Hydravion Mixte de Transport) -  3-seat amphibian transport; 1 built.

Operators

Air Union

Nationalist Chinese Navy

Specifications (HB.2)

See also

References

Further reading

External links
 Уголок неба

1920s French bomber aircraft
Flying boats
FBA aircraft
Single-engined tractor aircraft
Biplanes